Spring Dale Senior School is a private, English medium co-educational school in Amritsar, Punjab, India. Owned and managed by Sandhu family, the school is affiliated to the Central Board of Secondary Education (CBSE). Spring Dale Senior School offers education from classes I - XII and encourages the students to take part in various co-curricular activities held in the school such as music, dance, arts, and sports. The school also has a junior wing named Spring Blossoms School.

Academics

Academics is an important part of the school's core values. Quality Education is provided to all students at the school, without any discrimination on any basis. The school is home to many notable alumni, who have topped the city and the state. The school has over 300 teachers and over 5000 students being taught and is affiliated with the Central Board of Secondary Education (CBSE). 
One of the school's principals, Manveen Sandhu, was posthumously awarded the Kalpana Chawla award for promotion of art, culture and education. The current principal is Rajiv Kumar Sharma.

Parent Company:
The Parent Company of this school is Spring Dale Core Consultants Pvt. Ltd., Which is currently being headed by its president, Mr.Sahiljit Singh Sandhu.

References

External links
 

 High schools and secondary schools in Punjab, India